Rifda Irfanaluthfi (born 16 October 1999) is an Indonesian artistic gymnast.  She has represented Indonesia at the 2015, 2017, 2019, and 2021 Southeast Asian Games and at the 2018 Asian Games.  She is a four-time Southeast Asian Games champion.

Senior career

2015 
On 25 March 2015, Irfanaluthfi made her international debut at the Doha World Cup, performing on vault, balance beam, and floor exercise. She didn't make it past qualifications, with scores in the low 11 range.

In June 2015, she competed at the 2015 Southeast Asian Games, where she qualified to the all-around final in fifth place and three event finals: vault, in first place; beam, in second place; and floor, in second place. She finished fifth in the all-around final, with a total score of 49.600, after falling on her 2.5 twist on floor and her back handspring-back tuck series on beam. She finished fourth on vault after falling on her second vault, a full-twisting Yurchenko. She also finished fourth on balance beam, with another fall on her back handspring-back tuck series. But on floor, she finished second, just 0.033 behind Farah Ann Abdul Hadi, becoming the only Indonesian gymnast to medal at the competition.

In July, at the 2015 Asian Artistic Gymnastics Championships in Tokyo, she performed only her two best events, balance beam and floor, finishing sixth on balance beam and as the first reserve on floor exercise.

After she won three gold medals at the Indonesian National Students Games in September and two golds at the Indonesian National Youth Games—representing her home province, Jakarta—the Jakarta Department of Youth and Sport sent her to the 2015 World Artistic Gymnastics Championships in Glasgow. There, she placed 126th out of 191 gymnasts who competed all four events in qualifications, with a total score of 48.332. With some messy form on her front tuck half on vault, which the judges downgraded to a regular front tuck; a fall on her clear hip half in her low-difficulty bar routine; another fall on her flight series on beam; and a couple of stumbles on floor, she missed qualifying to the 2016 Olympic Test Event by about two points.

2016 
On 21–23 September, Irfanaluthfi competed at the Indonesian National Games. On the first day of competition, she earned a silver medal with Special Capital Region of Jakarta team and qualified to the all around, vault, and floor exercise. On the next day she won gold medal in the all around after scoring 13.600 on vault, 11.500 on bars, 13.500 on beam, and 13.866 on floor exercise, outscoring her nearest competitor by 3.5 points. In the event finals, she earned a gold on vault with a 13.399 average, and gold on floor with 13.866.

2017 
On May, Irfanaluthfi competed at the 2017 Islamic Solidarity Games in Baku, Azerbaijan. She claimed a bronze medal with the Indonesian team, behind of Azerbaijan and Turkey. Individually she placed third on all around and vault, fifth on uneven bars, and fourth on balance beam and floor exercise.

On August, Irfanaluthfi competed at the 2017 Southeast Asian Games in Kuala Lumpur, Malaysia. She won bronze medal on team competition with her teammates Amalia Fauziah, Armartiani, and Tazsa Miranda, though there was no official all around competition, her total scores of 51.350 was the highest in the competition. In event finals she won silver medal on vault, bronze on uneven bars, gold on balance beam, dan another bronze on floor exercise, making her the most decorated gymnast of the competition with five medals.

On 19–20 December, Irfanaluthfi competed at the Voronin Cup in Moscow, Russia. She competed on balance beam and floor exercise, place fifth on balance beam and won bronze medal on floor exercise behind Maria Kharenkova of Russia and Marina Nekrasova of Azerbaijan.

2018 
On March, Irfanaluthfi competed at Doha World Cup. She competed only on balance beam, place 31st with scores of 11.233 those failed to make it to final.

On 31 May to 3 June, Irfanaluthfi competed at the Koper Challenge Cup in Koper, Slovenia. She competed on all events expect uneven bars, where she placed eight on vault after a fall from her newly upgrade handspring front pike with half turn vault, sixth on balance beam, and fourth on floor exercise.

On 6–8 July, Irfanaluthfi competed at the Mersin Challenge Cup in Mersin, Turkey. She earned silver medal on vault with a 13.400 average, won her first world cup medal, and earned her second medal, a bronze on floor exercise with 12.150.

On 21–24 August, Irfanaluthfi competed at the 2018 Asian Games in her hometown Jakarta. On qualification she fell twice from uneven bars, her first event at the games and scores a 8.550 the lowest scores on the event, on balance beam her scores 12.400 placed her as first reserve for the final, missed out a placed in final by a tie breaker, on floor exercise she qualified fifth with 12.650, and qualified fifth on vault with average 13.500. In all around she placed eighteenth with scores 47.100. Indonesian team qualified to final on eighth place. She didn't competed on team final to rested herself for event finals. On event finals she placed fourth on vault with 13.287 average, and won silver medals on floor exercise, second medals for Indonesian team on gymnastics competition at the night, and first for woman competition.

On 28 October – 3 November At the 2018 World Artistic Gymnastics Championships in Doha, she finished 57th in the all-around in qualifications with a total score of 49.266: 13.433 on vault (58th), 10.600 on uneven bars (151st), 12.700 on balance beam (46th) and 12.533 on floor exercise (54th).

Competitive history

International scores

References

External links 
 Rifda Irfanaluthfi at Fédération Internationale de Gymnastique

1999 births
Living people
Sportspeople from Jakarta
Indonesian female artistic gymnasts
Gymnasts at the 2018 Asian Games
Asian Games silver medalists for Indonesia
Asian Games medalists in gymnastics
Medalists at the 2018 Asian Games
Competitors at the 2015 Southeast Asian Games
Competitors at the 2017 Southeast Asian Games
Competitors at the 2019 Southeast Asian Games
Southeast Asian Games gold medalists for Indonesia
Southeast Asian Games silver medalists for Indonesia
Southeast Asian Games bronze medalists for Indonesia
Southeast Asian Games medalists in gymnastics
Competitors at the 2019 Summer Universiade
Competitors at the 2021 Southeast Asian Games
21st-century Indonesian women